The High School Affiliated to Anhui Normal University  is a famous public high school in Wuhu City, Anhui, People's Republic of China. It was founded in 1903 and was named "Yu-Ying School" at that time. The campus is located near Mount Zhe in downtown of Wuhu, covering an area of approximately 63,400 square meters. The construction of a new campus was launched in December 2009.

See also
Anhui Normal University

References

External links
Official site

High schools in Anhui
Buildings and structures in Wuhu
Education in Wuhu
Anhui Normal University
Educational institutions established in 1903
1903 establishments in China